Robert K. Greenleaf  (1904–1990) was the founder of the modern Servant leadership movement and the Greenleaf Center for Servant Leadership.

Greenleaf was born in Terre Haute, Indiana in 1904. After graduating from Carleton College in Minnesota, he went to work for AT&T, then the American Telephone and Telegraph Company. For the next forty years he researched management, development, and education. All along, he felt a growing suspicion that the power-centered authoritarian leadership style so prominent in U.S. institutions was not working, and in 1964 he took an early retirement to found the Greenleaf Center for Servant Leadership (first called the "Center for Applied Ethics").

Philosophy
According to his essay, "Essentials of Servant Leadership", Greenleaf's philosophy had its roots from reading a work of fiction in 1958: "The idea of the servant as leader came out of reading Hermann Hesse’s Journey to the East. In this story, we see a band of men on a mythical journey… The central figure of the story is Leo, who accompanies the party as the servant who does their menial chores, but who also sustains them with his spirit and his song.  He is a person of extraordinary presence.  All goes well until Leo disappears. Then the group falls into disarray and the journey is abandoned.  They cannot make it without the servant Leo.  The narrator, one of the party, after some years of wandering, finds Leo and is taken into the Order that had sponsored the journey.  There he discovers that Leo, whom he had known first as servant, was in fact the titular head of the Order, its guiding spirit, a great and noble leader." His essay "Servant as Leader" inspires people all over the world.

A conceptual framework that is helpful for understanding servant-leadership is found in the “Ten Characteristics of the Servant-Leader” described by Larry Spears (1998).  Spears distills Greenleaf's (1977/2002) instrumental means into ten characteristics: listening, empathy, healing, awareness, persuasion, conceptualization, foresight, stewardship, commitment to the growth of people, and building community (pp. 3–6). It is important to note that these characteristics are not simply traits or skills possessed by the leader; a century of research has rejected what Bass and Stogdill (1990) referred to as an “approach [that] tended to treat personality variables in an atomistic fashion, suggesting that each trait acts singly to determine the effects of leadership” (p. 87). Rather, servant-leadership is an ethical perspective on leadership that identifies key moral behaviors that leaders must continuously demonstrate in order to make progress on Greenleaf's (1977/2002) “best test”.  The “best test”, which gives us the ethical ends for action, combined with Spears’ distillation of traits that identified the means, create a powerful framework for a review of the literature that furthers the conceptual framework for servant-leadership.

Works
Greenleaf was captivated by the idea of a servant actually being the leader.  In "Essentials" he wrote, “As it was, the idea lay dormant for 11 years during which I came to believe that we in this country were in a leadership crisis and that I should do what I could about it.”  In 1970 Greenleaf published his first essay, entitled "The Servant As Leader", which introduced the term "servant leadership." Later, the essay was expanded into a book, which is perhaps one of the most influential management texts yet written.  The Servant Leadership movement was born.

Of his philosophy, Robert Greenleaf wrote in "Essentials", 
"The servant-leader is servant first... Becoming a servant-leader begins with the natural feeling that one wants to serve, to serve first.  Then conscious choice brings one to aspire to lead.  That person is sharply different from one who is leader first... The difference manifests itself in the care taken by the servant first to make sure that other people's highest priority needs are being served.  The best test, and the most difficult to administer, is this: Do those served grow as persons?  Do they, while being served, become healthier, wiser, freer, more autonomous, more likely themselves to become servants?"
"A fresh critical look is being taken at the issues of power and authority, and people are beginning to learn, however haltingly, to relate to one another in less coercive and more creatively supporting ways.  A new moral principle is emerging, which holds that the only authority deserving of one’s allegiance is that which is freely and knowingly granted by the led to the leader in response to, and in proportion to, the clearly evident servant stature of the leader.  Those who choose to follow this principle will not casually accept the authority of existing institutions.  Rather, they will freely respond only to individuals who are chosen as leaders because they are proven and trusted as servants.  To the extent that this principle prevails in the future, the only truly viable institutions will be those that are predominantly servant led"  [italics original]
Greenleaf (2002) felt strongly that his  “best test” should apply to all of our institutions.  His “best test”, which he knew would be hard to grade, is stated:
Do those served grow as persons?  Do they, while being served [italics original], become healthier, wiser, freer, more autonomous, more likely themselves to become servants?  And [italics original], what is the effect on the least privileged in society?  Will they benefit or at least not be further deprived?.
Implementing Greenleaf's ideas in modern American institutions is anathema to many leaders and followers, who desire a different paradigm that is based on coercive power and control rather than legitimate power based on mutual agreements.  Greenleaf's book, however, is the text for anyone interested in connecting the two often disparate terms, servant and leader.  His work addressed these two questions in particular: How can leaders serve people?  What is the source of legitimate power?

Consulting work
Through the next twenty-five years Greenleaf served as a consultant to such notable institutions as MIT, the American Foundation for Management Research, and Lilly Endowment, Inc. He continued writing, fine-tuning his ideas and focusing them on several different areas of leadership.  For example, to apply Servant Leadership to an organizational level, he wrote "The Institution as Servant".  For educators he wrote "The Leadership Crisis: A Message for College and University Faculty" and "Teacher as Servant".  Other writings targeted seminaries, personal growth, religious leaders, and trustees, among others.

Legacy
Greenleaf influenced a whole generation.  In 1985, the Center for Applied Ethics changed its name to the "Greenleaf Center for Servant Leadership".  Though Greenleaf died in 1990, the Center continued his work; in 1996 it published two posthumous essay collections (available at Greenleaf.org).  Today scores of colleges and universities include Servant Leadership in their curricula and hundreds of companies embrace Greenleaf's philosophy.  As Greenleaf strived to serve through education, he became the leader of a movement.

Notes

References

Further reading

Bass, B. M., and Stogdill, R. M. (1990). Bass & Stogdill's Handbook of Leadership: Theory, Research, and Managerial Applications (3rd ed.). New York:Free Press.

Frick, Don M. (2004). Robert K. Greenleaf: A Life of Servant Leadership. San Francisco: Berrett-Koehler Publishers.

Greenleaf, R.K. (2003). The Servant-Leader Within:  a Transformative Path New York: Paulist Press.

Greenleaf, R. K. (2002). Servant Leadership: A Journey into the Nature of Legitimate Power and Greatness (25th anniversary ed.). New York: Paulist Press.

Hesse, H. (2003). The Journey to the East (H. Rosner, Trans.). New York: Picador.  (Original work published in 1932).

Spears, L. C., ed (1998). Insights on Leadership: Service, stewardship, spirit, and servant-leadership. New York: Wiley.

Warneka, T. H., (2008). Black Belt Leader, Peaceful Leader: An Introduction to Catholic Servant Leadership. Ohio: Asogomi.

External links
Robert K. Greenleaf Center

1904 births
1990 deaths
People from Terre Haute, Indiana
Carleton College alumni
American consultants
American Quakers
20th-century Quakers